Santiago Apostol is a 15th-century Roman Catholic church in the town of Orihuela in the Valencian Community, Spain.

Construction of the church in Valencian Gothic style began in the 15th century. The façade was added in Renaissance style, and the interiors have Baroque decoration.

References

Roman Catholic churches in the Valencian Community
15th-century Roman Catholic church buildings in Spain
Gothic architecture in the Valencian Community
Renaissance architecture in the Valencian Community